Lina Grinčikaitė-Samuolė (born 3 May 1987 in Klaipėda) is a track and field sprint athlete, who competes internationally for Lithuania.

Grinčikaitė represented Lithuania at the 2008 Summer Olympics in Beijing. She competed at the 100 metres sprint and placed third in her first round heat after Chandra Sturrup and Kelly-Ann Baptiste in a time of 11.43 seconds. She qualified for the second round, in which she improved her time to 11.33 seconds and placed second after Torri Edwards. With 11.50 seconds she placed sixth in her semi final race, which meant she was eliminated.

After finishing seventh at the 2009 European Athletics Indoor Championships, Grinčikaitė took the gold medal in the 100 m at the 2009 Summer Universiade, scoring a new personal best of 11.31 seconds in the process. She competed at the 2010 IAAF World Indoor Championships, but was eliminated in the semi-finals of the women's 60 metres.

Personal bests

All information taken from IAAF profile.

Achievements

References

External links 
 
 

1987 births
Living people
Sportspeople from Klaipėda
Lithuanian female sprinters
Athletes (track and field) at the 2008 Summer Olympics
Athletes (track and field) at the 2012 Summer Olympics
Olympic athletes of Lithuania
European Athletics Championships medalists
Universiade medalists in athletics (track and field)
Universiade gold medalists for Lithuania
Universiade bronze medalists for Lithuania
Competitors at the 2015 Summer Universiade
Medalists at the 2009 Summer Universiade
Medalists at the 2011 Summer Universiade